Mysore Sadashiva Rao (Mysore) or Sadasiva Rao was a notable Indian vocalist and composer of Carnatic music. He was a member of the court of the king of Mysore, Krishnaraja Wodeyar III.

Biography
Very little is known about Sadashiva Rao's early days. He was born in a Marathi-speaking Deshastha Brahmin family which had settled in modern-day Andhra Pradesh. It is believed that he was employed as a clerk in his early career before he travelled to Walajahpet near Madras where he ended up training under Venkataramana Bhagavatar, a pupil of Tyagaraja (1767–1847), one of the Trinity of Carnatic Music. It is also said that Rao once met Tyagaraja when the composer travelled to Walajahpet on a pilgrimage and briefly stayed with his disciple.

Sadashiva Rao travelled with two brothers, the merchants Kopparam Chinnamuni Swamy Setty and Padda Muniswamy, to Mysore, brought Sadashiva Rao to Mysore. By the time he was 30, Rao had found a place in the Mysore Wodeyar durbar. The royal patronage coupled with wealthy admirers and disciples allowed Rao to live comfortably for the rest of his life. He was also known for his charitable work.

Notable among Rao's many disciples were Veena Seshanna, Veena Subbanna, Shamanna (of Bettadapura), Venkatesayya, and Ganjam Suryanarayana. It is known that he had a daughter whose son T. Venkata Rama Rao became an actor on the stage popularly known as "Curtain" Rama Rao.

Compositions 
Sadashiva Rao has composed mostly in Telugu. He went on a pilgrimage of south India and composed krithis at all the temples he visited. Some of his compositions are, Devadideva (Mayamalavagaula), Gangadhara Tripuraharana (Purvikalyani), Paramabhuta Maina (Khamas) and many padavarnams including the famous Ye Maguva Bodhinchara set in the Raga Dhanyasi. Sadashiva Rao used the mudra 'Sadashiva'.

See also 
 List of Carnatic composers

References & Audio Links

Sources

External links
 Carnatica.net

Carnatic composers
Performers of Hindu music
Musicians from Mysore
Year of birth uncertain
19th-century Indian composers